The Subcommittee on Government Operations and Border Management is one of the four subcommittees within the Senate Committee on Homeland Security and Governmental Affairs. It was known in previous Congresses as the Subcommittee on Regulatory Affairs and Federal Management

Jurisdiction
Examining the federal rulemaking process including regulatory review, and evaluating the effectiveness, efficiency, economic impact, legal authority, and federal role for past and proposed regulations;
 Reviewing federal contracting and procurement, including the Federal Acquisition Regulation, and the acquisition functions of the General Services Administration and the Office of the Federal Procurement Policy;
 Assessing the management, efficiency, effectiveness, and economy of agencies and departments of the government, including oversight of issues related to energy and national security; 
 Examining and assessing the federal workforce and federal employee issues, including employees’ classification, compensation and benefits, and federal benefits and retirement programs;
 Evaluating and addressing the federal government's roles and responsibilities in America's economic competitiveness and cooperation with private industry;
 Reviewing and assessing border management and operations;
 Conducting oversight of:
 United States Postal Service modernization and solvency;
 United States Census Bureau; and
 The District of Columbia, excluding appropriations, but including the judicial system.

Members, 118th Congress

References

External links
 Official Subcommittee Website

Ad hoc committees
Homeland Security Regulatory